Kulczyk Investments SA (former Kulczyk Investment House SA) is an international investment company, founded by Polish entrepreneur Jan Kulczyk  in 2007, focusing on business opportunities in high-growth markets. The company's strategic sectors are energy, infrastructure, chemical industry and mineral resources. Kulczyk Holding SA is responsible for the operations of the group in Poland.

In November 2008, the company announced a change of name from Kulczyk Investment House to Kulczyk Investments. 

The name of the company comes from the name of the businessman and founder of Kulczyk Holding, Jan Kulczyk, who died on July 29, 2015, and served as chairman of the Supervisory Board of Kulczyk Investments until his death.

The company is led by a board which consists of:
Sebastian Kulczyk (chief executive officer);
Mariusz Nowak (Board Member at Kulczyk Investments, board member and chief financial officer at Kulczyk Holding);
Łukasz Rędziniak (general counsel, board member at Kulczyk Investments and Kulczyk Holding);
Jarosław Sroka (board member at KI One);
Dawid Jakubowicz (board member at Kulczyk Investments);

The company supervisory board are:
prof. Waldemar Frąckowiak, (chair);
Wolfgang M. Fritz;
Tomasz Piotr Mikołajczak.

The company is backed by the international advisory board, which supports it in creating and implementing of international development strategies. The board members are:
 James L. Jones, retired US Marine Corps general, former US National Security Advisor. Former NATO Supreme Allied Commander.
 Horst Köhler, former president of Germany (2004–2010), former chairman of International Monetary Fund and General Director of the European Bank for Reconstruction and Development.
 Aleksander Kwaśniewski, former President of Poland (1995–2005), a former leader of Social Democracy of the Republic of Poland, diplomat and active participant of international public life.

Business sectors

Energy

Polenergia is one of the key assets in the Kulczyk Investments portfolio as an operational centre, know-how base and a platform to carry out innovative energy projects in Poland and the region. The Polenergia Group is run by a team of international experts with unique expertise in managing complex investment projects. The company owns numerous operating onshore and offshore wind projects in Poland.

As a result, consolidation of assets of Polenergia Holding and Polish Energy Partners in August 2014, a new public company Polenergia SA was formed. The merger resulted in the creation of the largest private energy group, the leader of the domestic renewable energy market. At the same time, the international Chinese fund CEE Equity Partners holds a 15.99% share in Polenergia.

In March 2018, Polenergia has signed an agreement with Statoil to develop offshore wind farms in the Baltic Sea.

In August 2018, Dominika Kulczyk, who has a 50.2% stake in Polenergia SA, announced a tender offer to acquire remaining 49.8% stake in the company.

Chemical industry
Kulczyk Investments, through its subsidiary KI Chemistry, is a majority shareholder in Ciech SA, Europe's leading chemical group that counts itself among the 50 largest business organizations in Poland. As the strategic investor in Ciech, Kulczyk Investments has been implementing a long-term restructuring and development plan based on Kulczyk's own competence, international presence and access to capital essential for further expansion of Ciech. The Kulczyk Group has been present in the chemistry market for a decade. In 2003–2011, Kulczyk Investments, through its subsidiary Kulczyk Holding, was the owner of POCH, a chemical plant located in Gliwice.

Infrastructure

Through subsidiary companies, Kulczyk Investments carries out strategic road infrastructure projects in Poland. On 1 December 2012, the A2 motorway section to the Polish border with German was opened six months earlier than scheduled. It has been the largest concession based investment project in Poland carried out in public-private partnership, as well as the largest environmental project. The amount invested to construct both sections of the motorway exceeded PLN 9 billion.

Mineral resources

Kulczyk Investments has been a long-term investor in mineral resources exploration and production, specifically oil, natural gas, iron ore and coal. The company has consistently invested in a geographically diversified portfolio of assets at various risk levels and stages of development; from exploration ventures, through development of assets to production projects. A group of companies carries out over 100 projects in 30 countries on 4 continents on a total concession area of 260 thousand square kilometres.

Capital investments/Brewing

Kulczyk group has been present in this sector for nearly 19 years. The investment in Lech Browary Wielkopolski and the effective cooperation with SABMiller resulted in the creation of Kompania Piwowarska, one of the most advanced brewing companies in the world and the largest in Poland, with a current domestic market share of 42.6. In 2009, Kulczyk Investments became one of SABMiller's larger shareholders and started a new, global phase of cooperation with the world's second largest beer producer.

Real estate

Kulczyk Investments owns some of Warsaw’s key property portfolios in the city’s prime locations. In 2010, Kulczyk Investments established a joint venture with Silverstein Properties Inc, one of the most respected American real estate companies that, amongst others, is currently redeveloping the World Trade Centre. Kulczyk Silverstein Properties intends to develop and acquire prime real estate assets throughout Central and Eastern Europe. Kulczyk Silverstein Properties is currently in the development process of Chmielna Tower, which will be one of Warsaw's most innovative office towers.

Investments

Kulczyk Investments owns (directly or via subsidiaries) shares in following companies:

Current investments:
Mineral resources: Neconde Energy Limited, Serinus Energy, Loon Energy Corporation, San Leon Energy, Strata Limited, Centar;
Energy: Polenergia SA;
Infrastructure: Autostrada Wielkopolska SA, Autostrada Wielkopolska II SA, Autostrada Eksploatacja SA;
Brewing: SABMiller Plc;
Real-estate: Kulczyk Real Estate Holding S.ar.l., Kulczyk Silverstein Properties.

Completed investments:
Telecoms: Telekomunikacja Polska SA, Polska Telefonia Cyfrowa Sp. z o.o. (ERA GSM);
Fuels and mineral resources: PKN Orlen SA;
Financial services: TUiR Warta SA, PTE WARTA S.A.;
Automotive: Škoda Auto Polska SA, Kulczyk Pon Investment B.V.;
Chemical industry: POCH SA;
Brewing: Kompania Piwowarska SA;
Logistics: Pekaes SA.

Sponsorship activities
Kulczyk Investments is widely known from numerous sponsorship and CSR activities:
The Museum of the History of Polish Jews – a 20 million PLN donation from Kulczyk Holding for the permanent exhibition „1000 years of the history of Polish Jews”;
The Polish Olympic Committee – strategic sponsor;
Ryszard Kapuściński Award – patron award;
Malta Fundacja – main sponsor of Malta Festival Poznań;
The Grand Theatre – Polish National Opera – sponsorship agreement and funding of special projects;
Arnold Szyfman Polish Theatre (Warsaw) – patron celebrations of the 100th anniversary of the Polish Theatre;
 The Krzysztof Penderecki European Centre for Music – financial support for the construction of the centre;
Art Yard Sale – patron of the organization of art fair;
The Stanisław Moniuszko Grand Theatre, Poznań – support for Umberto Giordano's opera "Andrea Chenier and outdoor presentation of the opera" Carmen "by Georges Bizet;
Henryk Wieniawski Musical Society – Kulczyk Foundation as a patron of the Society supports its activities, including preparations for the International Henryk Wieniawski Violin Making Competition and the International Henryk Wieniawski Violin Competition;
The National Philharmonic in Warsaw – support in the organization of the series of concerts and events under the name „A Tribute to Arthur Rubinstein”.
The Studio Theatre – sponsorship of HD transmissions from the Metropolitan Opera in New York Shows;
The Jan Wejchert Award of the Polish Business Roundtable – Kulczyk Holding patron of the prize;
Kulczyk Foundation – established in 2013 by Grażyna Kulczyk, dr Jan Kulczyk and Dominika Kulczyk. The objective of the Foundation is helping the poorest people by supporting transparent and efficient development projects in Poland and abroad. Through education, Kulczyk Foundation draws the attention of people and enterprises to the fact that helping the poorer countries and communities is one of the important means of development on the global scale. The Foundation helps the non-governmental organizations to operate professionally, increase their effectiveness and expand operations. It delivers not only financial support but also the know-how to efficiently change the reality;
CEED Institute – founded by Jan Kulczyk in 2010, is an international think-tank aimed at promoting the achievements and the economic potential of Central and East European countries. The objective of the CEED Institute is the dissemination of ideas and projects intended to improve the efficiency and competitiveness of the CEE region. President Lech Wałęsa is the honorary ambassador of the CEED Institute;
Green Cross Poland – in 2010, on the initiative of Jan Kulczyk, the Polish branch of Green Cross was launched for dialogue among business, administration, NGOs and academic centres. GCPL takes part in environmental protection projects related to green economy, green cities and clean water;
The Lech Wałęsa Institute – Kulczyk Investments is the strategic partner of the Lech Wałęsa Institute. The institute has been established to bring together many social groups around the never-ageing ideas of state decentralisation, ethics in politics and necessity to nurture the tradition of independence. Creation of an expert platform supporting Lech Wałęsa allowed him to work for the benefit of Poland, both home and abroad;
RESPECT Index – Kulczyk Investments has developed the methodology and co-created the RESPECT Index – the first stock exchange index of responsible companies in Central Europe. The publication of the index at the Warsaw Stock Exchange has commenced in November 2009 and initiated the development of the idea of responsible capital investments in Poland. In 2011, Kulczyk Investments has transferred the rights to the RESPECT Index to the Warsaw Stock Exchange. The index is still being developed and constitutes a tangible and a long-lasting asset created by the Kulczyk Investments specialists.

References

External links 
 

Financial services companies established in 2007
Financial services companies of Poland
Investment companies of Luxembourg
Kulczyk family